Toma Bašić (born 25 November 1996) is a Croatian professional footballer who plays as a midfielder for Serie A club Lazio and the Croatia national team.

Career

Toma Bašić went through the ranks of NK Zagreb, before signing for Hajduk Split in the summer of 2014, the same generation as Fran Tudor. He remained in the City of Zagreb, however, having been immediately loaned out to the Druga HNL side Rudeš, where he remained for the rest of the season. The beginning of the 2015–16 season saw him at Hajduk, balancing between the main and the reserve squad. He made his first team and Prva HNL debut on 10 August 2015 in a 1–2 away win against Lokomotiva, coming in for Andrija Balić in the 84th minute.

In August 2018, Bašić joined Ligue 1 side Bordeaux for €3.5 million and signed a four-year contract. He debuted on 12 August in a 2–0 home defeat to Strasbourg, coming on in 72nd minute for Aurélien Tchouaméni. On 19 December, he scored his first goal for the club, in a Coupe de la Ligue game against Dijon that ended in a 1–0 victory.

On 25 August 2021, Bašić signed for Serie A side Lazio. He made his debut on 12 September in a 2–0 defeat to Milan, coming on in 74th minute for Sergej Milinković-Savić. He scored his debut goal on 30 September, in a Europa League 2–0 victory over Lokomotiv Moscow.

International career
Bašić was selected to Nenad Gračan's 23-man squad for UEFA Under-21 Euro 2019, remaining an unused substitute throughout the tournament as Croatia finished last in their group.

On 4 November 2020, senior team head coach Zlatko Dalić called Bašić up for November fixtures against Turkey, Sweden and Portugal. He debuted on 11 November, playing last 30 minutes in a friendly 3–3 draw with Turkey. He notably broke the ball during the game.

On 17 May 2021, he was included in Dalić's preliminary 34-man squad for the UEFA Euro 2020; however, he did not make the final 26.

Personal life
Bašić was born and raised in the Dubrava neighborhood of Zagreb, and was a fan of Hajduk Split through his father, who is originally from Pirovac in Dalmatia. He has a twin brother Jakov, who is also a footballer.

Career statistics

Club

International

References

External links

1996 births
Living people
Footballers from Zagreb
Croatian twins
Twin sportspeople
Association football midfielders
Croatian footballers
Croatia international footballers
Croatia under-21 international footballers
Croatia youth international footballers
Croatian Football League players
First Football League (Croatia) players
Ligue 1 players
Serie A players
HNK Hajduk Split players
NK Rudeš players
FC Girondins de Bordeaux players
S.S. Lazio players
Croatian expatriate footballers
Expatriate footballers in France
Expatriate footballers in Italy
Croatian expatriate sportspeople in France
Croatian expatriate sportspeople in Italy